Chu Lam Yiu is a Chinese billionaire and the founder of Huabao International Holdings, a fragrances and tobacco flavoring company. She founded the company in 1996 and took it public on the Hong Kong Stock Exchange through a "backdoor listing" in 2006. According to Forbes, she is one of China's richest women with a net worth of USD 2.4 billion in 2022.

In 2022, she was placed under investigation for “suspected disciplinary violations” along with her son, Lam Ka Yu, as the Chinese government began cracking down on corruption in the tobacco industry. Her daughter, Lam Ka Yan, a Columbia University graduate, was named an executive director at the company amid the government probe.

References

21st-century Chinese businesswomen
21st-century Chinese businesspeople
Chinese billionaires
Female billionaires
Living people
Year of birth missing (living people)